Sailing at the 2019 Southeast Asian Games was held at Subic Bay Yacht Club from 2 to 9 December 2019.

Participating nations

Medal table

Medalist

Men

Women

Mixed

References

External links
 

2019 Southeast Asian Games events